Ladislaus I (also spelled Vladislav I or Władysław I) may refer to:

Ladislaus I of Hungary (1040–1095), King of Hungary
Ladislaus I Herman (1040–1102), Duke of Poland
Władysław II the Exile (1105–1159), Duke of Silesia, sometimes known as Ladislaus I the Exile
Vladislaus II, Duke of Bohemia (-1174), who reigned as King Vladislaus I of Bohemia
Vladislav I of Serbia, King of Serbia (1234-1243)
Ladislaus I of Opole (1246–1281), Duke of Opole
Wladislaus I of Oswiecim (c. 1314 – c. 1321), Duke of Oświęcim
Władysław I the Elbow-high (1261–1333), King of Poland (also known as Ladislaus the Short, or Władysław I Łokietek)
Vladislav I of Wallachia (died 1377), Prince of Wallachia (also known as Vlaicu-Vodă)
Ladislaus I of Naples (1377–1411), King of Naples

See also 
 Ladislaus (disambiguation)
 Ladislaus I of Poland (disambiguation)